Daniel 'Dani' Mallo Castro (born 25 January 1979) is a Spanish former professional footballer who played as a goalkeeper.

The better part of his senior career was spent at Deportivo, where he served almost exclusively as third choice in the first team, and Girona. Over eight seasons, he appeared in 152 matches in Segunda División.

Club career
Born in Cambre, Galicia, Mallo spent most of his career as third-string goalkeeper with local Deportivo de La Coruña, having a loan stint at second division team Elche CF in the 2003–04 season. He first appeared with the main squad of the former on 4 May 2003, playing 20 minutes in a 5–0 home win over Recreativo de Huelva.

Mallo joined Portugal's S.C. Braga for 2006–07 after being released. Because of injury to first choice Paulo Santos, he started the first half of the following campaign, also featuring for the club in the Portuguese and UEFA Cups.

In late January 2009, after having spent the first months of the new season training separately, Mallo joined Falkirk until the end of the season. He played in the Scottish Cup final, also helping the side to the semi-finals of the domestic League Cup and a final maintenance in the Scottish Premier League; despite these achievements, he did not sign a new contract and left the club on 27 June, stating he needed to move on.

In July 2009, Mallo turned down a move to join former manager John Hughes at Hibernian FC, opting to return to Spain and sign with Girona FC in the country's second level. In his first year he deputised for former FC Barcelona's Albert Jorquera, and played understudy to Roberto Santamaría in the following campaign, becoming the starter subsequently.

On 30 June 2016, after a further three years in the second tier, with CD Lugo and Albacete Balompié, being relegated in the last one, 37-year-old moved to the Indian Super League, joining three compatriots (including manager José Francisco Molina, his former Deportivo teammate) at Atlético de Kolkata.

Personal life
Cambre's municipal ground was named after Mallo.

References

External links

1979 births
Living people
Sportspeople from the Province of A Coruña
People from A Coruña (comarca)
Spanish footballers
Footballers from Galicia (Spain)
Association football goalkeepers
La Liga players
Segunda División players
Segunda División B players
Tercera División players
Deportivo Fabril players
Deportivo de La Coruña players
Elche CF players
Girona FC players
CD Lugo players
Albacete Balompié players
CE L'Hospitalet players
Primeira Liga players
S.C. Braga players
Scottish Premier League players
Falkirk F.C. players
Indian Super League players
ATK (football club) players
Spain youth international footballers
Spain under-21 international footballers
Spanish expatriate footballers
Expatriate footballers in Portugal
Expatriate footballers in Scotland
Expatriate footballers in India
Spanish expatriate sportspeople in Portugal
Spanish expatriate sportspeople in Scotland
Spanish expatriate sportspeople in India